Tirumangalakottai East is a village in the Orathanadu taluk of Thanjavur district, Tamil Nadu, India.

Demographics 
As per the 2001 census, Tirumangalakottai East had a total population of 2742 with 1389 males and 1353 females. The sex ratio was 974. The literacy rate was 67.55.

References 
 

Villages in Thanjavur district